George Pringle Robertson (22 August 1842 – 23 June 1895) was an Australian cricketer. He played four first-class cricket matches for Victoria between 1866 and 1872.

Robertson was a son of William Robertson who settled in Tasmania, where George was born in Hobart. He was educated at Rugby School and Trinity College, Oxford. He returned to Colac, Victoria, where his family had moved, and managed the family estate with his brothers.

See also
 List of Victoria first-class cricketers

References

1842 births
1895 deaths
Australian cricketers
Victoria cricketers
Cricketers from Hobart
Melbourne Cricket Club cricketers
Oxford University cricketers
People educated at Rugby School
Alumni of Trinity College, Oxford